This is a list of the butterflies of India belonging to the subfamily Limenitidinae of the family Nymphalidae and an index to the species articles. This forms part of the full List of butterflies of India.

A total of 99 species belonging to 20 genera are found in India.

Limenitis - admirals

 Indian white admiral, Limenitis trivena Moore, 1864

Summalia - green commodore

 Green commodore, Sumalia daraxa (Doubleday, 1848)
 Scarce white commodore, Sumalia zulema (Doubleday & Hewitson, 1848)

Moduza - commander

 Commander, Moduza procris (Cramer, 1777)

Parasarpa - commodores

 White commodore, Parasarpa dudu (Doubleday, 1848)
 Bicolour commodore, Parasarpa zayla (Doubleday, 1848)

Auzakia - commodore

 Commodore, Auzakia danava (Moore, 1858)

Athyma - sergeants

 Unbroken sergeant, Athyma pravara Moore, 1857
 Bhutan sergeant, Athyma jina Moore, 1858
 Common sergeant, Athyma perius (Linnaeus, 1758)
 Studded sergeant, Athyma asura Moore, 1858
 Great sergeant, Athyma larymna (Doubleday, 1848)
 Dot-dash sergeant, Athyma kanwa Moore, 1858
 Malay staff sergeant, Athyma reta Moore, 1858
 Blackvein sergeant, Athyma ranga Moore, 1857
 Himalayan sergeant, Athyma opalina (Kollar, 1844)
 Staff sergeant, Athyma selenophora (Kollar, 1844)
 Small staff sergeant, Athyma zeroca Moore, 1872
 Orange staff sergeant, Athyma cama Moore, 1858
 Colour sergeant, Athyma nefte (Cramer, 1780)
 Colour sergeant, Athyma inara Doubleday 1850
 Andaman sergeant, Athyma rufula de Nicéville, 1889 
 Spotted sergeant, Athyma sulpitia (Cramer, 1779)

Lebadea - knight

 Knight, Lebadea martha (Fabricius, 1787)

Pantoporia - lascars

 Assam lascar, Pantoporia assamica (Moore, 1881)
 Tytler's lascar, Pantoporia bieti (Oberthür, 1894)
 Common lascar, Pantoporia hordonia (Stoll, 1790)
 Extra lascar, Pantoporia sandaka (Butler, 1892)
 Perak lascar, Pantoporia paraka (Butler, 1879)
 Karwar lascar, Pantoporia karwara Fruhstorfer, 1906 (Kanara, Western India) (valid?)

Lasippa - lascars

 Burmese lascar, Lasippa heliodore (Fabricius, 1787)
 Burmese lascar, Lasippa tiga (Moore, 1858)
 Yellowjack sailer, Lasippa viraja (Moore, 1872)

Neptis - sailers

 Chestnut-streaked sailer, Neptis jumbah Moore 1857
 Indian dingiest sailer, Neptis harita Moore, 1875
 Neptis ilira Kheil, 1884
 Neptis vikasi Horsfield, [1829]
 Small yellow sailer, Neptis miah Moore, 1858
 Yerbury's sailer, Neptis yerburii Butler, 1886
 Pallas' sailer, Neptis sappho (Pallas, 1771)
 Common sailer, Neptis hylas Linnaeus, 1758
 Clear sailer or southern sullied sailer, Neptis clinia Moore, 1872
 Clear sailer, Neptis nata Moore, 1858
 Shortbanded sailer, Neptis columella (Cramer, 1780)
 Sullied sailer, Neptis soma Moore, 1858
 Himalayan sailer, Neptis mahendra Moore, 1872
 Broad-banded sailer, Neptis sankara (Kollar, 1844)
 Pale-green sailer, Neptis zaida Doubleday, 1848
 Spotted sailer, Neptis magadha C. & R. Felder, 1867
 Great yellow sailer, Neptis radha Moore, 1857
 Broadstick sailer, Neptis narayana Moore, 1858
 Yellow sailer, Neptis ananta Moore, 1858
 Rich sailer, Neptis anjana Moore, 1881
 Less rich sailer, Neptis nashona Swinhoe, 1896
 Hockeystick sailer, Neptis nycteus de Nicéville, 1890
 Pale hockeystick sailer, Neptis manasa Moore, 1857
 Manipur yellow sailer, Neptis namba Tytler, 1915
 Plain sailer, Neptis cartica Moore, 1872
 Armand's sailer, Neptis armandia Oberthür, 1876 
 Chinese yellow sailer, Neptis cydippe Leech, 1890
 Spotted sailer, Neptis magatha (Stoll) (?)
 Clear sailer, Neptis nandina Moore, 1858

Phaedyma - great hockeystick sailer

 Great hockeystick sailer, Phaedyma aspasia (Leech, 1890)
 Short-banded sailer, Phaedyma columella (Cramer, [1780])

Parthenos - clipper

 Clipper, Parthenos sylvia (Cramer, 1775)

Bhagadatta - grey commodore

 Grey commodore, Bhagadatta austenia (Moore, 1872)

Euthalia - barons

 Powdered baron, Euthalia monina, (Moore, 1859)
 White-tipped baron, Euthalia merta (Moore, 1859)
 Euthalia eriphylae de Nicéville, 1891
 White-edged blue baron, Euthalia phemius (Doubleday, 1848)
 Common baron, Euthalia aconthea (Cramer, 1777)
 Streaked baron, Euthalia alpheda (Godart, [1824]) (ssp. jama) C. & R. Felder, 1867
 Grey baron, Euthalia anosia (Moore, 1858)
 Euthalia malaccana Fruhstorfer, 1899
 Gaudy baron, Euthalia lubentina (Cramer, 1777)
 Baronet, Euthalia nais (Forster, 1771)
 Blue duchess, Euthalia duda (Staudinger, 1855)
 French duke, Euthalia franciae (Gray, 1846)
 Naga duke, Euthalia khama Alphéraky, 1898
 Bronze duke, Euthalia nara Moore, 1859
 Grand duchess, Euthalia patala (Kollar, 1844)
 Green duke, Euthalia sahadeva (Moore, ?1861)
 Blue baron, Euthalia telchinia (Ménétriés, 1857)
 Euthalia curvifascia (Tytler, 1915)

Tanaecia - counts

 Andaman viscount, Tanaecia cibaritis Hewitson, 1874
 Grey count, Tanaecia lepidea (Butler, 1868)
 Lavender count, Tanaecia cocytus (Fabricius, 1787)
 Common earl, Tanaecia julii (Lesson, 1837)
 Plain earl, Tanaecia jahnu (Moore, 1857)

Neurosigma - panther

 Panther, Neurosigma siva (Westwood, 1850)

Abrota - sergeant-major

 Sergeant-major, Abrota ganga Moore, 1857

Dophla - redspot duke

 Redspot duke, Dophla evelina (Stoll, 1790)

Lexias - archdukes

 Great archduke, Lexias cyanipardus (Butler, 1869)
 Lexias pardalis (Moore, 1878)
 Archduke, Lexias dirtea (Fabricius, 1793)

Bassarona - dukes

 Blue duke, Bassarona durga (Moore, 1857)
 Grand duke, Bassarona iva Moore, 1857
 Redtail marquis, Bassarona recta (de Nicéville, 1886)
 Banded marquis, Bassarona teuta (Doubleday, 1848)

See also
Nymphalidae
List of butterflies of India

Cited references

References
 
 
 
 
 

Limenitidinae

B